Domant Futebol Clube de Bula Atumba is an Angolan sports club from the village of Bula Atumba, in the northern province of Bengo.
The team currently plays in the Gira Angola and is based in the province's capital city of Caxito.

History
The club has its origins in the early 1990s in another club called Desportivo da Vidrul which was sponsored by a glass factory called Vidrul. By then, the team was led by Mr. Domingos António, a young man in his 20s who managed to keep the club alive by taking part in several local competitions. Ever since, the team went through various changes until being established on 23 May 2005, as Domant FC. On 6 December 2006, the team took part in the President's Cup (the equivalent in Angola to the 3rd division championship).

In 2014, Domant FC became the first ever team from the province of Bengo to play in Girabola.

In 2017, the club qualified for the Angolan top division, the Girabola, for the second time.

Achievements
Angolan League: 0

Angolan Cup: 0

Angolan SuperCup: 0

Gira Angola: 0

League & Cup Positions

Recent seasons
Domant FC's season-by-season performance since 2011:

 PR = Preliminary round, 1R = First round, GS = Group stage, R32 = Round of 32, R16 = Round of 16, QF = Quarter-finals, SF = Semi-finals

Players and staff

Players

Staff

Manager history and performance

See also
Girabola
Gira Angola

References

External links
 Official blog
 Girabola.com profile
 Zerozero.pt profile

Association football clubs established in 2005
Football clubs in Angola
Sports clubs in Angola